The women's 800 metres event at the 1972 European Athletics Indoor Championships was held on 11 and 12 March in Grenoble.

Medalists

Results

Heats
First 2 from each heat (Q) and the next 2 fastest (q) qualified for the final.

Held on 11 March

Final
Held on 12 March

References

800 metres at the European Athletics Indoor Championships
800